Christian Leuprecht (born 28 May 1971) is a former Italian male long-distance runner who competed at three editions of the IAAF World Cross Country Championships at senior level (1991, 1992, 1996).

See also
 List of European junior records in athletics

References

External links
 
 
 Christian Leuprecht at FIDAL 
 

1971 births
Living people
Italian male long-distance runners
Italian male marathon runners
Italian male cross country runners